"Truth" is a song by Azerbaijani singer Chingiz Mustafayev. It represented Azerbaijan at the Eurovision Song Contest 2019 in Tel Aviv, Israel. It was performed during the second semi-final held on 16 May 2019, and qualified for the final, where it finished in eighth place with 302 points.

Eurovision Song Contest

The song was chosen to represent Azerbaijan in the Eurovision Song Contest 2019, after Chingiz was internally selected by the Azerbaijani broadcaster. On 28 January 2019, a special allocation draw was held which placed each country into one of the two semi-finals, as well as which half of the show they would perform in. Azerbaijan was placed into the second semi-final, to be held on 16 May 2019, and was scheduled to perform in the second half of the show. Once all the competing songs for the 2019 contest had been released, the running order for the semi-finals was decided by the show's producers rather than through another draw, so that similar songs were not placed next to each other. Azerbaijan performed in position 18, and qualified for the final. It finished in eighth place with 302 points.

Charts

References

External links

2019 songs
Eurovision songs of 2019
Eurovision songs of Azerbaijan
Songs written by Trey Campbell
Songs written by Borislav Milanov
Songs written by Joacim Persson